This is a list of episodes for the anime Space Runaway Ideon.

Episodes

Space Runaway Ideon